Werner Lourens (born 26 June 1990) is a South African professional rugby union player, currently playing with the . His regular position is lock.

Career

Youth and Varsity Rugby

Lourens joined the  academy and was a member of the  squad that participated in the 2009 Under-19 Provincial Championship.

He made five appearances for them during the 2010 Varsity Cup competition and also participated in the Carlton League.

In 2012, he was a member of the ' wider training group, but (despite interest from the Welkom-based outfit to sign him permanently) decided to play in the 2013 Varsity Shield instead, where he started six matches for TUT, scoring one try against .

Griffons

He made his first class debut for the Griffons in their match against  in Kimberley, ending on the losing side of a 20–12 scoreline. He made three more starts during the competition as the Griffons finished sixth in their group. He made a further four appearances for the  during the 2014 Currie Cup qualification series as they finished third to remain in the 2014 Currie Cup First Division competition.

Free State Cheetahs

An injury crisis for the  during the 2014 Currie Cup Premier Division saw Lourens make a short-term move to Bloemfontein.

References

South African rugby union players
Living people
1990 births
Rugby union players from Pretoria
Rugby union locks
Free State Cheetahs players
Griffons (rugby union) players
Tshwane University of Technology alumni